Ontario High School is a public, coeducational high school located in Ontario, Ohio (U.S).  The school serves students in grades 9 to 12 and is part of the Ontario Local Schools district. The school mascot is a warrior.

Demographics 

For the 2021–2022 school year, of the 512 students, 417 (81%) were white, 37 (7%) two or more races, 22 (4%) black, 19 (4%) Hispanic, 14 (3%) Asian, two (0.4%) American Indian/Alaska Native, and one (0.2%) Native Hawaiian/Pacific Islander.

State championships

 Boys Baseball – 1994

Notable alumni
  – (class of 1989)

References

External links
 
 Ontario Local Schools—OntarioSchools.org

High schools in Richland County, Ohio
Public high schools in Ohio